The Sand Springs Range is a short mountain range located in western Nevada in the United States within the Great Basin. It separates  Salt Wells (to the west) from Fairview Valley (to the east). To the north, it is separated from the Stillwater Range by Sand Springs Pass. To the south is Gabbs Valley.

The Sand Springs Range was the site of Project Shoal, an underground nuclear test conducted as part of the Vela Uniform program. As the area experienced a series of large earthquakes in 1954, seismic traces for the events could be compared to help differentiate future Soviet underground nuclear tests from earthquakes. The site is unrestricted and unmarked. No surface crater was formed, and the casual observer will find little evidence that the event ever took place.

The Sand Springs Range also has several large military radar installations.  These are associated with the bombing range in Fairview Valley, the electronic warfare range in Dixie Valley, and Naval Air Station Fallon.

Notes 

Mountain ranges of Nevada
Mountain ranges of the Great Basin
Mountain ranges of Churchill County, Nevada
American nuclear test sites
Nuclear test sites